The hoof (plural: hooves) is the tip of a toe of an ungulate mammal, which is covered and strengthened with a thick and horny keratin covering. Artiodactyls are even-toed ungulates, species whose feet have an even number of digits, yet the ruminants with two digits, are the most numerous, e.g. giraffe, deer, bison, cattle, goat, and sheep. The feet of perissodactyl mammals have an odd number of toes, e.g. the horse, the rhinoceros, and the tapir. Hooves are limb structures restricted to placental mammals, which have long pregnancies; however, the marsupial Chaeropus had hooves.

Description 

The hoof surrounds the distal end of the second phalanx, the distal phalanx, and the navicular bone. The hoof consists of the hoof wall, the bars of the hoof, the sole and frog and soft tissue shock absorption structures. The weight of the animal is normally borne by both the sole and the edge of the hoof wall. Hooves perform many functions, including supporting the weight of the animal, dissipating the energy impact as the hooves strike the ground or surface, protecting the tissues and bone within the hoof capsule, and providing traction for the animal. Numerous factors can affect hoof structure and health, including genetics, hoof conformation, environmental influences, and athletic performance of the animal. The ideal hoof has a parallel hoof-pastern axis, a thick hoof wall, adequate sole depth, a solid heel base and growth rings of equal size under the coronary band.

There are four layers within the exterior wall of the hoof. From the outside, a hoof is made up of the stratum externum, the stratum medium, the stratum internum and the dermis parietis. The stratum externum and the stratum medium are difficult to distinguish, the stratum externum is thin and the stratum medium is what makes up the bulk of the hoof wall. Inside the hoof wall is a laminar junction, a soft tissue structure that allows the hoof to withstand the demands of force transmission it undergoes. This tissue structure binds the inner surface of the hoof wall, the dermis parietis and the outer surface of the third phalanx.

Most even-toed ungulates (such as sheep, goats, deer, cattle, bison and pigs) have two main hooves on each foot, together called a cloven hoof. Most of these cloven-hooved animals also have two smaller hooves called dewclaws a little further up the leg – these are not normally used for walking, but in some species with larger dewclaws (such as deer and pigs) they may touch the ground when running or jumping, or if the ground is soft. In the mountain goat, the dewclaw serves to provide extra traction when descending rocky slopes as well as additional drag on loose or slippery surfaces made of ice, dirt, or snow.  Other cloven-hooved animals (such as giraffes and pronghorns) have no dewclaws.

In some so-called "cloven-hooved" animals, such as camels, the "hoof" is not properly a hoof – it is not a hard or rubbery sole with a hard wall formed by a thick nail – instead it is a soft toe with little more than a nail merely having an appearance of a hoof.

Some odd-toed ungulates (equids) have one hoof on each foot; others have (or had) three distinct hooved or heavily nailed toes, or one hoof and two dewclaws. The tapir is a special case, having three toes on each hind foot and four toes on each front foot.

Management

Hooves grow continuously. In nature, wild animals are capable of wearing down the hoof as it continuously grows, but captive domesticated species often must undergo specific hoof care for a healthy, functional hoof. Proper care improves biomechanical efficiency and prevents lameness. If not worn down enough by use, such as in the dairy industry, hooves may need to be trimmed. However, too much wear can result in damage of the hooves, and for this reason, horseshoes and oxshoes are used by animals that routinely walk on hard surfaces and carry heavy weight.

Horses 
Within the equine world, the expression, "no foot, no horse" emphasizes the importance of hoof health. Hoof care is important in the equine industry. Problems that can arise with poor horse hoof care include hoof cracks, thrush, abscesses and laminitis.

Cattle

A cow hoof is cloven, or divided, into two approximately equal parts, usually called claws. Approximately 95% of lameness in dairy cattle occurs in the feet. Lameness in dairy cows can reduce milk production and fertility, and cause reproductive problems and suffering. For dairy farm profitability, lameness, behind only infertility and mastitis, is the third most important cow health issue.

Hoof trimmers trim and care for bovine hooves, usually dairy cows. Hooves can be trimmed with a sharp knife while the cow is restrained and positioned with ropes. Professional hoof-trimming tend to use angle grinders and of some type of hoof trimming crush to make the process quicker and less physically demanding on the hoof trimmer. A hoof trimmer using modern machinery may trim the hooves of more than 10,000 cows per year. The trimmer shapes the hooves to provide the optimal weight bearing surface. A freshly trimmed hoof may be treated with copper sulfate pentahydrate to prevent foot rot.

Gallery

In culture
Hooves have historical significance in ceremonies and games.  They have been used in burial ceremonies.

See also
Claw
Hoof glue
Horse hoof
Nail (anatomy)

Notes

References 

Mammal anatomy